Le Petit Chasseur is the name of a megalithic site in Sion, Valais, Switzerland.
Discovered in 1961, it consists of three dolmen, dated to between 2900 and 2200 BC.
It is associated with the Saône-Rhône culture, part of the local late Chalcolithic phase (éolithique final valasian).
The younger parts of the site are associated with the  Bell Beaker horizon, including a cemetery with the remains of about 90 individuals (Dolmen M XII).

Archaeological findings 
Archaeologists found six aligned standing stones in La Petit, in July 2019. These standing stones were found accidentally during the construction work of a residential building, in the same area where 30 such stones and the dolmens were found in 1960.

“This discovery is of prime importance to help us understand social rituals at the end of the Neolithic period (around 2,500BC) in central Europe,” was announced from the canton of Valais. According to the press release, a number of stones were noticed to have been intentionally broken.

Three of the standing stones were carved with markings. The largest of the stones assumed to be a male figure wearing geometrically decorated clothes with a sun-like motif around his face is about two tonnes.

References 

 Die Schweiz vom Paläolithikum bis zum frühen Mittelalter. Vom Neandertaler bis zu Karl dem Grossen. Band 2: Werner E. Stöckli u. a. (Hrsg.): Neolithikum. Schweizerische Gesellschaft für Ur- und Frühgeschichte, Basel 1995, .
 Harrison R., Heyd V., "The transformation of Europe in the third millennium BC: The example of 'Le Petit Chasseur I & III' (Sion, Valais, Switzerland)",  Prähistorische Zeitschrift 82 (2007), 129–214.

Archaeology of Switzerland
Megalithic monuments in Europe
Dolmens
Sion, Switzerland
Beaker culture